H. roseus may refer to:
 Hydrocoloeus roseus, the Ross's gull, a bird species
 Hypomyces roseus, a synonym for Trichothecium roseum, a fungus species

See also
 Roseus (disambiguation)